Living in the Past is a double album quasi-compilation collection by Jethro Tull, which contains album tracks, out-takes, the "Life Is a Long Song" EP, and all of their non-LP singles except for "Sunshine Day"/"Aeroplane" (1968), "One for John Gee" (b-side of "A Song for Jeffrey", 1968), "17" (b-side of "Sweet Dream", 1969) and the original version of "Teacher" that appeared in the UK as the b-side of "The Witch's Promise" in 1969 (the re-recorded 1970 take that was released on the American version of Benefit was included instead). Also included are two live recordings taken from a performance at New York City's Carnegie Hall in November 1970.

Details
The album was named after the single released in May 1969 and was released in an elaborate gate-fold packaging that contained a large colour photo booklet with over 50 photos of the band.

Two songs, "By Kind Permission Of" and "Dharma for One", were recorded live at Carnegie Hall in New York City, United States.  The former would be extended to include "With You There To Help Me" and would be included in complete form, along with "Dharma For One", on the separate LP release Live At Carnegie Hall 1970 (2015).

"Love Story", "Christmas Song", "Living in the Past", "Driving Song", "Sweet Dream" and "The Witch's Promise", some of which had only appeared on mono versions before, were given new stereo mixes for inclusion on the album. Additionally, "A Song for Jeffrey" and "Teacher" were also remixed. Many of the tracks only appeared as British releases before being compiled on Living in the Past for the first time in the American market. Spurred on by radio airplay of the single, "Living in the Past", US rock fans who bought the album were treated to three years of UK releases.

In the United States, Living in the Past was the first Jethro Tull album to appear on the Chrysalis Records label; while each of the band's previous albums were marked as "a Chrysalis Production", the albums were released by Warner Bros. Records' Reprise Records subsidiary. Early U.S. editions of Living in the Past bore both a Chrysalis catalogue number (2CH 1035) and a Reprise catalogue number (2TS 2106), suggesting that the album was scheduled to appear on Reprise Records but that Chrysalis gained control of the band's USA releases in late 1972.

All of the tracks that were not on the original This Was (1968), Stand Up (1969) and Benefit (1970) albums have appeared as bonus tracks on their 2001 Digital Remasters.

Critical reception

AllMusic review the collection positively, stating that: "Not only was Ian Anderson writing solid songs every time out, but the group's rhythm section was about the best in progressive rock's pop division. Along with any of the group's first five albums, this collection is seminal and essential to any Tull collection, and the only compilation by the group that is a must-own disc."

Charts
The album peaked at No. 3 on the Billboard 200 charts and went gold not long after its release. The title track from the album became Tull's first top-40 hit in the United States, reaching No. 11, a full three years after it performed well in Britain. In UK, the album reached No. 13. In Norwegian charts, the album hit No. 5.

Differences in US version
The US vinyl version has "Hymn 43" in place of "Locomotive Breath" (both from the Aqualung album). It omits "Inside" and "Teacher", which were both on the US Benefit album, replacing them with "Alive and Well and Living in" and "Witch's Promise".

Track listing

Original vinyl versions

UK vinyl 

 Some pressings of this album erroneously list 'From Later' as 'For Later'. However, it is listed correctly as 'From Later' on both the Life Is a Long Song EP and on the Aqualung 40th Anniversary Special Edition..

US vinyl

CD releases 
Differences in the song selections between the US and the UK editions of the album resulted in different track listings for the various CD releases. Most CDs had to further alter the track listings, due to time constraints as CDs at the time could only hold up to 74 minutes of music.  Since the original American CD edition of Benefit was released with the alternative track list omitting "Alive and Well and Living In", many of the US CD editions of Living in the Past add that track. All of the single CD reissues omit two songs ("Bourée" and "Teacher") in order to reduce the running time to fit the album on one disc, but both countries' versions include "Inside", which originally was only on the UK vinyl. A 1997 two-disc Mobile Fidelity Sound Lab reissue contains every song selected for the UK and US vinyl editions.

UK single-disc reissue (Chrysalis UK 1990, F2-21575) 

 Omits "Bourée" and "Teacher" from the UK vinyl version.

American single-disc reissue (Chrysalis US 1992, 0946 3 21035 2 9/F2-21035) 

 Same track list as the UK single-disc re-issue but with additional track "Alive and Well and Living In", and "Locomotive Breath" is replaced by "Hymn 43".

Mobile Fidelity Sound Lab edition (UDCD 2-708, 1997 remaster)

 This release contains all of the songs released on the UK and US versions of the album.

Personnel

Jethro Tull
 Ian Anderson – vocals, flute, mandolin, tin whistle, electric guitar (12 string (on "Sweet Dream"), acoustic guitar (on "Just Trying to Be", "Wond'ring Again", "Life Is a Long Song", "Up the 'Pool" and "Dr. Bogenbroom"), balalaika; Hammond organ (on "Singing All Day"), violin
 Mick Abrahams – electric guitar (on "A Song for Jeffrey" and "Love Story")
 Martin Barre – electric guitar, acoustic guitar (on "Witch's Promise" and "Life Is a Long Song"), backing vocals and additional percussion (on "Dharma for One")
 John Evan – piano, Hammond organ, Mellotron, harpsichord, celeste, backing vocals and additional percussion (on "Dharma for One")
 Glenn Cornick – bass guitar; Hammond organ (on "Singing All Day")
 Jeffrey Hammond (as Jeffrey Hammond-Hammond) – bass guitar (on "Hymn 43", "Locomotive Breath", "Life Is a Long Song", "Up the 'Pool", "Dr. Bogenbroom" and "From Later")
 Clive Bunker – drums, percussion, backing vocals (on "Dharma for One")
 Barriemore Barlow – drums (on "Life Is a Long Song", "Up the 'Pool", "Dr. Bogenbroom" and "From Later")

Additional personnel
 Dee Palmer – string and orchestra conductor arrangements (on "Christmas Song" and "Sweet Dream")
 Lou Toby – string arrangement and conductor (on "Living in the Past")
 Andy Johns – sound engineering

Charts

Weekly charts

Year-end charts

Certifications

See also 
 Jethro Tull discography
 Living with the Past, 2002 live album

References

External links
  (main)
  (UK)
  (Truncated)
 Jethro Tull - Living in the Past (1972) album review by Bruce Eder, credits & releases at AllMusic.com
 Jethro Tull - Living in the Past (1972) album releases & credits at Discogs.com
 Jethro Tull - Living in the Past (1972) album review by Sviskebisk at SputnikMusic.com
 Jethro Tull - Living in the Past (1972) album to be listened as stream at Play.Spotify.com
 Jethro Tull - Living in the Past (1972): Japanese Mini LP replica CD reissue, 2004

Jethro Tull (band) compilation albums
1972 compilation albums
Chrysalis Records compilation albums
Albums produced by Ian Anderson
Albums produced by Terry Ellis (record producer)